The Gennach is a river in Bavaria, Germany. It flows into the Wertach near Schwabmünchen.

See also
List of rivers of Bavaria

References

Rivers of Bavaria
Rivers of Germany